is a Japanese politician of the Liberal Democratic Party, a member of the House of Councillors in the Diet (national legislature). A native of Arita, Saga and dropout of Chuo University, he had served in the assembly of Saga Prefecture for six terms since 1975 and was elected to the House of Councillors for the first time in 1995.

References

External links 
 Official website in Japanese.

Members of the House of Councillors (Japan)
Living people
1942 births
Liberal Democratic Party (Japan) politicians